Robert Dussey (born January 4, 1972) is a Togolese politician and minister. Since September 17, 2013, he is the Minister of Foreign Affairs, Cooperation and African Integration of Togo entered the second government Kwesi Ahoomey-Zunu,  renewed in the Government of Komi Selom Klassou from June 28, 2015, to January 4, 2019, and still serves as the Minister of Foreign Affairs, African integration and Togolese abroad. He is the ACP's Chief Negotiator and Chair of the Ministerial Central Negotiating Group for the New ACP-EU Partnership post-Cotonou 2020.

Biography 
Born January 4, 1972, in Bangui, Central African Republic, Dussey was a seminarian (Saint Paul Seminary of Bangui); Franciscan friar and monk of the Catholic Community of the Beatitudes.

A professor of political philosophy and Kantian, Dussey is a specialist in issues of peace, management, and resolution of armed conflicts.

Political career 

From 2005 to 2013, Dussey acted as the diplomatic advisor to the President Faure Gnassingbé. Since September 2013, he became responsible for the Ministry of Foreign Affairs, Cooperation and African Integration of Togo.

In 2018, in the context of the ACP-EU negotiations for Post-Cotonou 2020, Dussey was appointed as chief negotiator of the ACP Group. The ACP-EU Post-Cotonou 2020 negotiations officially started on September 28, 2018 in New York.

Distinctions 

 Ranked in 2015, 2016, and 2019 by the magazine "NewAfrican" on the list of the 100 most influential personalities on the African continent
 Knight of the Legion of Honor of France in 2012

Bibliography 

 Life without life: novel , Editions Bognini, Abidjan 2000
 For lasting peace in Africa: advocacy for an African conscience of armed conflict , Editions Bognini, 2002
 Thinking reconciliation in Togo , Editions Bognini, Abidjan 2003
 Africa sick of its politicians: Unconsciousness, irresponsibility, ignorance or innocence? , Jean Picollec, 2008
 A comedy in the tropics, L'Harmattan, 2011

External links 

 Personal website
 Twitter feeds
 Interview: Professor Robert Dussey, chief negotiator of the ACP Group
 Robert Dussey at AIPAC 2017

References 

Chevaliers of the Légion d'honneur
People from Bangui
1972 births
Togolese diplomats
Government ministers of Togo
Foreign ministers of Togo
Living people
21st-century Togolese people